American hip hop artist Krizz Kaliko has released seven studio albums, four EPs and 41 music videos

Albums

Studio albums

EPs

Guest appearances

Music videos

References

Discographies of American artists
Hip hop discographies